Wejdene Chaïb (born 23 April 2004), known by her mononym Wejdene, is a French singer. She rose the fame in 2020 with her single "Anissa", a success on TikTok among other social media platorms.

Early life
Born April 23, 2004, in Saint-Denis in Seine-Saint-Denis, Wejdene grew up in Brunoy (Essonne), in a family of Tunisian origin. The singer emerged on the French R&B scene in 2019. Guette Music showed an interest after her first titles, and signed her without delay. Wejdene then unveiled the titles "J'attends" and "Trahison", recorded with Larsé, another artist at the label. Her song "J'peux pas dead" generated more than two and a half million views in just three months. 

Her first album, 16, is released on September 25, 2020, with the title as a reference to her age, which she had kept secret until then. It is composed of twelve tracks, without any featured artists, for a duration of half an hour.

In 2022, A few weeks before the release of the album Glow Up, Feuneu (his producer and manager), stopped music and decided to repent and turn to religion after the murder of his 19-year-old "little brother", Ariel. The rapper YKM, the ex of Wejdene, is accused of murdering his best friend in the sensitive city of Hautes-Mardelles in Brunoy. After this tragedy, Wejdene announces that she needs to take a step back in October 2022. On December 16, 2022, she released her new album, Glow Up. The album is composed of two parts: a "good mood" part and a "bad mood" part. Despite the promotion of this new album, it does not obtain the expected success. By positioning itself in 106th place in the first week, the album made less than 1,400 sales compared to 17,000 sales for album 16 in 2020.

Discography

Albums

As lead artist

References 

21st-century French singers
Living people
2004 births
21st-century French women singers
People from Saint-Denis, Seine-Saint-Denis
French people of Tunisian descent